All The People Are Talkin' is the fifth studio album by American country music artist John Anderson. It was released in 1983 under Warner Bros. Records. Singles from it include the Number One country hit "Black Sheep" and "Let Somebody Else Drive".

Critical reception
PopMatters called the songs "upbeat, bluesy pop-rock numbers that still sound thoroughly country in Anderson's hands." Chuck Eddy, in The Village Voice, called All the People Are Talkin' "raucous" and Anderson's "only real hair-up-the-butt rock'n'roll album."

Track listing

Personnel
 Donna Kay Anderson - background vocals
 John Anderson - electric guitar, lead vocals, background vocals
 Larry Emmons - bass guitar
 Mike Jordon - organ, piano
 X. Lincoln - tic-tac bass
 Tom Morley - fiddle, mandolin
 Vernon Pilder - acoustic guitar, electric guitar 
 Bill Puett - saxophone, flute
 Buck Reid - steel guitar
 Deanna Anderson Walls - background vocals
 James Wolfe - drums

Charts

Weekly charts

Year-end charts

References

John Anderson (musician) albums
1983 albums
Warner Records albums